On 4 August 2018, a de Havilland Canada DHC-2 Beaver aircraft operated by K2 Aviation crashed in poor weather near Denali, Alaska, United States. All five people on board survived the crash, but died before rescuers were able to arrive at the scene. The five people consisted of the pilot and four Polish tourists.

Rescue efforts
Upon crashing, the aircraft's ELT alerted the Alaska Rescue Coordination Center at about 6:00 pm local time on Saturday. The pilot contacted K2 Aviation via satellite phone at 7:00 pm to report his situation and request help. The pilot called at least two times and reported his coordinates as well as the medical condition of the passengers. However, due to extreme weather and reduced visibility, only limited search and rescue operations were feasible. A National Guard HH-60 Pave Hawk helicopter, and a Denali National Park A-Star B3e helicopter were deployed on Saturday evening after the crash, but were unable to locate the crash site or make radio contact.

On the morning of Monday, August 6th, the National Park Service transported a rescuer to the crash site on a helicopter. When the ranger arrived at the site, the aircraft was buried in snow, and four occupants were deceased within. The fifth occupant could not be located, but was presumed dead due to the absence of footprints leading away from the crash site, which would indicate an attempt to self-rescue.

The rescue operations were coordinated by K2 Aviation, Alaska State Troopers, the National Park Service, Alaska Air National Guard, the NTSB, the FAA and other authorities. Aircraft involved in the search also included a Lockheed HC-130, and a de Havilland Beaver loaded with an emergency survival kit.

The National Park Service reported in August 2018 that there are no plans to recover the aircraft or the bodies of those killed. The NTSB is investigating the incident, and no final report has been published as of April 2019.

See also
2013 Soldotna Rediske Air DHC-3 Otter crash

References

2018 in Alaska
August 2018 events in the United States
Accidents and incidents involving the de Havilland Canada DHC-2 Beaver
Aviation accidents and incidents in the United States in 2018
Aviation accidents and incidents in Alaska
Denali Borough, Alaska